Bakhvain Buyadaa (born 20 May 1946) is a retired Mongolian judoka who competed at the 1972 and 1976 Olympics. He finished second in 1972, but tested positive for Dianabol, an anabolic steroid, and was disqualified, becoming the first Olympic judoka to fail a drug test. He finished in tenth place in 1976.

Buyadaa came to the 1972 Olympics with a freestyle wrestling background and no firm knowledge of judo rules. Yet he won his first two bouts, and was close to beating the reigning world champion Takao Kawaguchi in the third. Kawaguchi broke two ribs while escaping from the ground pin by Buyadaa, but managed to win by close decision. In the repechage Buyadaa won against another favorite, Jean-Jacques Mounier. He quickly lost the final to Kawaguchi, and was stripped of his silver medal for failing a drug test.

References

1946 births
Living people
Mongolian male judoka
Olympic judoka of Mongolia
Judoka at the 1972 Summer Olympics
Judoka at the 1976 Summer Olympics
Competitors stripped of Summer Olympics medals
20th-century Mongolian people
21st-century Mongolian people